Calamochrous homochroalis is a moth in the family Crambidae. It was described by Charles Swinhoe in 1907. It is found on the Andamans in the Indian Ocean.

References

Moths described in 1907
Pyraustinae